Tehachapi (Kawaiisu: Tihachipia, meaning "hard climb") is a city in Kern County, California, United States, in the Tehachapi Mountains, at an elevation of , between the San Joaquin Valley and the Mojave Desert. The Tehachapi area is known for the nearby Tehachapi Loop (a popular railfan site), the Pacific Crest Trail and for the excellent conditions for the aerial sport of gliding.

History

The Kawaiisu people (also Nuwu ("people" in Kawaiisu), or Nuooah) are the Native American tribe whose homeland was the Tehachapi Valley, and seasonally the southern Sierra Nevada and Mojave Desert, for thousands of years.

One possibility for the origin of the name Tehachapi comes from the Kawaiisu language.  It may be derived from the word for "hard climb" or tihachipia, according to the Tomi-Kahni Resource Center. The settlement has been formerly known and spelled as: Tehachapai; Tehachapa; Tehachepi; Tehachipi; and Summit Station. According to Yokuts informant Wahumchah, recorded by anthropologist Frank Forrest Latta, Tehachapi derives from a Yokuts-Ute amalgam, from Yokuts taheech[e] "oak-covered flat" + Ute pah''' "water" (cl. Pah-ute, lit. 'Water Ute'). On an 1864 map of California, the name appears as Taheechepah.Previously known as 'Old Town', Tehachapi was established in the 1860s. It was briefly known as Greenwich and Williamsburg prior to the name change in 1876. It is now registered as California Historical Landmark #643 for being the oldest settlement in the Tehachapi Valley.

Construction of the original Southern Pacific-SP railroad depot was the beginning of the downtown core. It is now on the National Register of Historic Places (NRHP)—and was the oldest building in downtown Tehachapi until it burned in June 2008. The building had been in the final stages of becoming a museum. It has since been rebuilt using the original plans with only minor modifications to meet modern building codes. The new depot was dedicated on June 5, 2010.

1952 Kern County earthquake

Tehachapi experienced the 7.3 magnitude 1952 Kern County earthquake on the White Wolf Fault. At the time, the earthquake was the largest in Southern California in the twentieth century and the largest since the 1872 Lone Pine earthquake. It was felt as far away as Reno, Nevada. Twelve people died in the quake and severe damage was done to buildings and rail lines in the area.

Geography
Faults
The 1857 Fort Tejon earthquake on the San Andreas Fault had an estimated magnitude of 7.9 but there is no record of the local effects of this quake. The Garlock Fault last ruptured approximately 500 years ago.

 Climate 

Tehachapi has a subtropical mediterranean climate (Köppen Csa).

Tehachapi is known for its four-season climate. The wet season is generally November through May, although thunderstorms are common during the summer, especially over the nearby mountain peaks. The area typically collects  of snow each winter.

Annual precipitation averages  and there is measurable precipitation on average of 42 days annually. The snowiest year was 1967, when  fell.

Demographics
The population was 14,414 at the 2010 census, up from 10,957 at the 2000 census.

2010
The 2010 United States Census reported that Tehachapi had a population of 14,414.

The racial makeup of Tehachapi was 9,426 (65.4%) White, 1,297 (9.0%) African American, 206 (1.4%) Native American, 238 (1.7%) Asian, 21 (0.1%) Pacific Islander, 2,725 (18.9%) from other races, and 501 (3.5%) from two or more races. Hispanic or Latino of any race were 5,466 persons (37.9%).

The Census reported that 8,487 people (58.9% of the population) lived in households, 6 (0%) lived in non-institutionalized group quarters, and 5,921 (41.1%) were institutionalized.

There were 3,121 households, out of which 1,199 (38.4%) had children under the age of 18 living in them, 1,504 (48.2%) were opposite-sex married couples living together, 418 (13.4%) had a female householder with no husband present, 181 (5.8%) had a male householder with no wife present. There were 194 (6.2%) unmarried opposite-sex partnerships, and 18 (0.6%) same-sex married couples or partnerships. 879 households (28.2%) were made up of individuals, and 428 (13.7%) had someone living alone who was 65 years of age or older. The average household size was 2.72. There were 2,103 families (67.4% of all households); the average family size was 3.34.

The population was spread out, with 2,599 people (18.0%) under the age of 18, 1,542 people (10.7%) aged 18 to 24, 5,891 people (40.9%) aged 25 to 44, 3,115 people (21.6%) aged 45 to 64, and 1,267 people (8.8%) who were 65 years of age or older.  The median age was 34.4 years. For every 100 females, there were 234.8 males. For every 100 females age 18 and over, there were 283.0 males.

The homeowner vacancy rate was 3.2%; the rental vacancy rate was 12.2%. 4,913 people (34.1% of the population) lived in owner-occupied housing units and 3,574 people (24.8%) lived in rental housing units.

2000
As of the census of 2000, there were 10,957 people, 2,533 households, and 1,709 families residing in the city.

The racial makeup of the city was 57.2% White, 13.8% Black or African American, 1.4% Native American, 0.7% Asian, 0.2% Pacific Islander, 23.8% from other races, and 3.0% from two or more races. 32.7% of the population were Hispanic or Latino of any race.

There were 2,533 households, out of which 35.6% had children under the age of 18 living with them, 47.5% were married couples living together, 14.3% had a female householder with no husband present, and 32.5% were non-families. 28.8% of all households were made up of individuals, and 13.5% had someone living alone who was 65 years of age or older. The average household size was 2.59 and the average family size was 3.19.

In the city, the population was spread out, with 18.5% under the age of 18, 12.9% from 18 to 24, 42.7% from 25 to 44, 16.5% from 45 to 64, and 9.4% who were 65 years of age or older. The median age was 33 years. For every 100 females, there were 224.8 males. For every 100 females age 18 and over, there were 270.0 males.

The median income for a household in the city was $29,208, and the median income for a family was $40,030. Males had a median income of $50,446 versus $26,023 for females. The per capita income for the city was $18,220. 20.4% of the population and 17.4% of families were below the poverty line. Out of the total population, 24.5% of those under the age of 18 and 15.5% of those 65 and older were living below the poverty line.

Economy

Tehachapi has historically been agrarian, with apples, peaches, grain, vegetables and hay grown year-round.

Wine grapes were grown in the area from the 19th century up until prohibition. A 2007 application to the Alcohol and Tobacco Tax and Trade Bureau (TTB) for the "Tehachapi/Cummings Valley AVA" was declined due to insufficient planted acreage. The Tehachapi Mountains American Viticultural Area was approved in 2020.

Roughly half of Tehachapi's water supply originates as groundwater that is replenished by local precipitation; the other half comes from the California Aqueduct.

The California Correctional Institution, a maximum security prison also known as Tehachapi State Prison, is in the area.

The Tehachapi area has been a center for renewable wind energy, containing 4,531 turbines that produce 3,200 megawatts of electricity as of 2019. In the same year, Amazon announced it would begin sourcing wind energy from Tehachapi as part of its goal to become carbon-neutral by 2040.  The Tehachapi Energy Storage Project, commissioned in 2014, is located at Monolith Substation.

In 2019, a Walmart store opened in Tehachapi, which would provide up to 200 full and part-time jobs.

Recreation and culture

The Tehachapi area is known for the nearby Tehachapi Loop (a popular railfan site), Tehachapi Pass Wind Farm, the Tehachapi Depot Museum, the Tehachapi Museum, the Tomo-Kahni State Historic Park and Tomi-Kahni Resource Center (Native American), and excellent air conditions for gliding. Tehachapi is on the Pacific Crest Trail.  to the west, at Keene, is the National Chavez Center, established to share the legacy of Cesar Chavez.
 
 Cycling 
Tehachapi has a thriving and growing cycling community for both mountain biking and road cycling. The Tehachapi Gran Fondo, a mass cycling event in September, was named Best Century by Cycle CA magazine two years in a row.

Tehachapi Mountain Trails Association (TMTA) is a local group of riders and trail builders. The trails are often used for singletrack mountain biking. TMTA members are walkers, hikers, road bicyclists, mountain bikers, horseback riders, and outdoor enthusiasts interested in developing and preserving multi-use non motorized trails throughout the greater Tehachapi area.

Community orchestra and theater

Tehachapi boasts two local orchestras. The Tehachapi Community Orchestra, now called the Tehachapi Symphony Orchestra, was founded in 1997 by Joan Samara and Deborah Hand as an outgrowth of the Da Camera Players String Ensemble, and incorporated in 1998 by Gayel Pitchford. It performs 5 free-to-the public concerts each year, with familiar selections from the classical canon.  This orchestra and its founders' vision were profiled in the Sept/Oct 2005 issue of Symphony Magazine. (See also The Tehachapi News October 12, 1997)

The Tehachapi Pops Orchestra (T-Pops), founded in 2006 by Deborah Hand, plays an eclectic blend of popular and jazz music, as well as original compositions. T-Pops performs 5 to 6 concerts each year. All are free to the public except for the Halloween concert held at the Beekay Theater with the local theater group, the Tehachapi Community Theater.

, a local theater group, the Tehachapi Community Theater, performs in the restored downtown BeeKay Theater.

 Government 

 Law enforcement 
The Tehachapi Police Department has been dissolved and reformed several times throughout the city's history. Initially created with the founding of the city, it was later disbanded. It was reestablished in 1955 and disbanded a second time. It was reestablished once more on November 27, 2006, with the swearing in of the Chief of Police, Jeff Kermode. , the chief of police is Kent Kroeger.

Media
Newspapers
The city has several local news publications, including the Tehachapi News (since 1899) and The Loop.

Transportation
The Tehachapi Park and Ride facility at 335 W Tehachapi Boulevard offers free parking and connections to Kern Transit and Amtrak Thruway buses.  Kern Transit Route 100 goes from Lancaster to Bakersfield.  The Amtrak Thruway bus provides connections to Oxnard and Santa Barbara.

Tehachapi Municipal Airport is located approximately one mile east of the Park and Ride facility.

In popular culture
Film productions
Tehachapi has been host to productions by both Hollywood and independent filmmakers, as well as being frequently mentioned, particularly during the noir era.

Perhaps the first movie to be filmed in Tehachapi was The Lady of the Dugout (1918), which starred former outlaws Al and Frank Jennings playing themselves. The brother outlaws were well known to Americans of the time.

Referencing the local women's prison was a common manner in which Tehachapi received mention in noir film, including James M. Cain adaptations The Postman Always Rings Twice and Double Indemnity, in which Fred MacMurray's character tells of one woman who killed her husband: "All she collected was a three-to-ten stretch in Tehachapi (neither of Cain's novels mention Tehachapi)."

In The Maltese Falcon, Sam Spade (played by Humphrey Bogart) tells a female criminal and love interest, "Well, if you get a good break, you'll be out of Tehachapi in twenty years and you can come back to me then." In the book, the reference was not to Tehachapi but to San Quentin.Nocturne (1946) featured a housemaid mysteriously referred to as the "Tehachapi Debutante," and 1948's The Hunted has a heroine fresh out of Tehachapi after four years for jewelry theft.

In The Story of Molly X (1949), Molly X is the leader of a San Francisco gang sent to Tehachapi for her role in a burglary attempt instead of San Quentin for execution. Most of the film then takes place at the prison, as Molly goes from being trouble to a model prisoner.

In 1001 Rabbit Tales, Bugs Bunny tells the sultan's son that Hansel and Gretel's witch was sent to Tehachapi.

In Star Trek Generations (1994), actors Patrick Stewart and William Shatner appear in a scene filmed in the Tehachapi mountains.

The Christina Applegate vehicle originally titled Tehachapi sends her character to Tehachapi because her lover is in prison here. The movie was eventually released under the title Across the Moon (1995).

The fourth season of the teen-geared television series, Endurance produced by the Discovery Kids Network was filmed in Tehachapi and aired from 2005 to 2006.

In Mac and Me (1988), after the characters state they have to "drive to Woolworth's in Palmdale" the next shot shows them driving up a dirt road through a Tehachapi wind farm. Similarly, Terminal Velocity (1994) has a fight sequence filmed on top of a hill in one of the farms.Herbie: Fully Loaded (2005) shot a sequence at a wind farm and on Oak Creek Road, which winds through several farms.

Tehachapi was featured in several episodes of the Animal Planet reality show Pit Bulls and Parolees. The show focuses on the Villalobos Rescue Center and the pit bulls cared for by the center; in 2011, the rescue's application to use property owned in Tehachapi to expand rescue operations was denied by the Kern County Planning Department.

Other movies filmed in Tehachapi include Face to Face (2001), Fault (2002), Batman: Revenge (2003), The Gentleman Don La Mancha (2004), I.F.O. (Identified Flying Object) (1985), Motor Mansions (2005), The Legend of Bloody Mary (2008), The Grapes of Wrath (1940, featuring the scene at Keene Ranch), and The Hangover Part III (2013).

Music

The American Country Rock band Little Feat references Tehachapi in its song, Willin', written by its multi-instrumentalist band member Lowell George. The song has been covered numerous times, most notably by Linda Ronstadt on her 1974 album, Heart Like a Wheel, by Commander Cody and His Lost Planet Airmen on its 1975 eponymous album, and by Gregg Allman on his 2017 album, Southern Blood (released posthumously).

Condor mass perching
In May 2021, a resident came home after a holiday to find that about 15 to 20 condors had descended on her home. She said, "To have that many condors on my house was surreal; they can be destructive and messy. Nature is amazing!" The birds had ripped up decking, taken to a bath spa and knocked over several plants.

The Fish and Wildlife Service responded to tweets about the incident that the house is in a condor habitat where there are food sources and that sometimes condors use houses and decks as perch locations. Spokeswoman Pam Bierce said that as condors re-colonized historical ranges "people could increasingly find themselves interacting with the curious, intelligent and social birds".

Mickols' daughter Seana Quintero stated that all-in-all her mother was in "good stride and appreciating this once-in-a-lifetime annoyance but hoping they decide to leave her house alone soon".

See also

 List of cities and towns in California
 California Historical Landmarks in Kern County

References

External links

City of Tehachapi - 
Tehachapi Chamber of Commerce
Tomo-Kahni State Historic Park website—Kawaiisu Native American Village, near Tehachapi''

 
Cities in Kern County, California
Incorporated cities and towns in California
Tehachapi Mountains
1909 establishments in California
Populated places established in 1909
Cities in the Mojave Desert